Harold John Neill (11 February 1907 – 22 November 1966) was an Australian rules footballer who played with South Melbourne, Footscray and St Kilda in the VFL.

A follower, Neill had stints with Williamstown, South Melbourne and Footscray before arriving at St Kilda where he played the majority of his football. He was St Kilda's best and fairest winner in 1931.

External links 

Harry Neill's playing statistics from The VFA Project

1907 births
1966 deaths
Williamstown Football Club players
Sydney Swans players
Western Bulldogs players
St Kilda Football Club players
Trevor Barker Award winners
Australian rules footballers from Melbourne
People from Newport, Victoria